Chester Arthur "Swede" Johnston (March 7, 1910  – September 19, 2002) was an American football back primarily for the Green Bay Packers of the National Football League (NFL). Johnston also played for the Cincinnati Reds, St. Louis Gunners, Cleveland Rams, and Pittsburgh Steelers.

Johnston was born in Appleton, Wisconsin to Swedish immigrant parents. In 1981, he was inducted into the Green Bay Packers Hall of Fame. He died in St. Louis, Missouri and is buried in Dodgeville, Wisconsin.

References

External links

1910 births
2002 deaths
Sportspeople from Appleton, Wisconsin
Players of American football from Wisconsin
American football running backs
Marquette University alumni
Miami Hurricanes football players
St. Louis Gunners players
Green Bay Packers players
Pittsburgh Pirates (football) players
Pittsburgh Steelers players
Cincinnati Reds (NFL) players
American people of Swedish descent
Elmhurst Bluejays football players
Burials in Wisconsin